"Uptown Top Ranking" is a song by Jamaican teenage singers Althea Forrest and Donna Reid, recorded when they were 17 and 18 years old respectively. Released in 1977, the song comprises the girls ad-libbing to deejay track "Three Piece Suit" by Trinity. The lyrics were written by the duo and Errol Thompson. It was produced by Joe Gibbs, using a re-recording of the riddim of the 1967 Alton Ellis song "I'm Still in Love", which had already been re-popularised in the 1970s by Marcia Aitken's cover "I'm Still in Love With You Boy", and "Three Piece Suit" by Trinity, to which "Uptown" was an "answer record".

The record was initially recorded as a joke.  It was accidentally played by BBC Radio 1 DJ John Peel resulting in numerous requests for additional plays. With early championing by Peel and a performance on Top of the Pops, it soon became a surprise hit, reaching number one on the UK Singles Chart in February 1978. The track spent a total of 11 weeks in the charts. Althea & Donna became the youngest female duo to reach the number-one spot on the UK chart.

Charts

Weekly charts

Year-end charts

Certifications

Sampling
The song was sampled in Abs Breen's 2002 UK top 10 hit single, "What You Got".

See also
List of UK Singles Chart number ones of the 1970s
List of one-hit wonders on the UK Singles Chart

References

1977 songs
1977 debut singles
Jamaican reggae songs
UK Singles Chart number-one singles
Lightning Records singles